Npower may refer to:

 N-Power (Nigeria), Nigerian Federal Government programme to empower youth. 
 npower (United Kingdom), a gas and electricity supply company in the UK
 NPower (USA), a network of nonprofit technology assistance providers in the United States
 Npower, a line of electronics from Nickelodeon which includes music/media players, digital cameras and DVD players